John Tucker Campbell (December 12, 1912 – August 26, 1991) was an American businessman and politician who was Secretary of State of South Carolina.  He was awarded the Order of the Palmetto 18 October 1972 by Governor John C. West.

He served in the U.S. Army Air Force 1942–1946 as an Air Transport Pilot in Europe and the South Pacific.
He was mayor of Columbia, South Carolina 1970–1978. He was Secretary of State of South Carolina 1978–1991.
He served as member of Columbia City Council two four year terms.
He was past president of South Carolina Municipal Association and past member of the advisory board of National League of Cities, past member of its board of directors, Finance Committee, Transportation Committee and Steering Committee on Revenue sharing.

He was a member of American Legion, VFW, DAV and Jamil Temple Shrine, chairman of the Easter Seal Society Buck-A-Cup (BAC) for two years and past governor of South Carolina Optimist Clubs.

He was married to Gertrude Davis Campbell.  He was the owner of Campbell Drug Stores for 41 years.

References
Bill 4063. South Carolina General Assembly. "Expressing the sorrow of the members of the general assembly at the death of the honorable John T. Campbell [...]"

1912 births
1991 deaths
Secretaries of State of South Carolina
United States Army Air Forces pilots of World War II
South Carolina Democrats
University of South Carolina alumni
Mayors of Columbia, South Carolina
People from Calhoun Falls, South Carolina
20th-century American politicians